Notre Dame Catholic High School is a private, Roman Catholic high school in Fairfield, Connecticut, United States. It is located in the Roman Catholic Diocese of Bridgeport.

Notre Dame Catholic High School was founded in 1955 by the Most Reverend Lawrence Shehan, who believed "The future of our country depends on our youth. To provide them with sound religious and moral training is a major concern of all of us."

History
The school, built on Park Avenue in Bridgeport, Connecticut, was a co-institution staffed by the Sisters of Notre Dame de Namur, the Holy Cross Fathers, Diocesan clergy and several lay men and women.

In 1956, the first classes of Notre Dame were held at Our Lady of Assumption school in Fairfield while the building was being completed. It opened in September 1957 with a freshman and sophomore class of 1000 students.

In 1964, the school and property of Notre Dame became Sacred Heart University. Two new high schools were established: Notre Dame Girls' in Bridgeport and Notre Dame Boys' in Fairfield. The schools continued to be staffed by the Sisters of Notre Dame de Namur at the girls' school, the Holy Cross Fathers at the boys school, and an increasing number of laity.

In 1973, the two schools were merged into the present Notre Dame Catholic High School, a co-educational institution open to all levels of academic ability and religious background.

References

External links
 
 Roman Catholic Diocese of Bridgeport

Catholic secondary schools in Connecticut
Roman Catholic Diocese of Bridgeport
Schools in Fairfield County, Connecticut
Educational institutions established in 1955
Holy Cross secondary schools
Sisters of Notre Dame de Namur schools
Buildings and structures in Fairfield, Connecticut
1955 establishments in Connecticut